The Refugees may refer to:
 The Refugees (novel), an 1893 novel by British writer Sir Arthur Conan Doyle
 The Refugees (TV series), a 2015 drama about time travellers
 The Refugees (band), an American folk trio
 The Refugees (short story collection), a 2017 short story collection by Viet Thanh Nguyen

See also 
 Refugee (disambiguation)